In enzymology, an ecdysone O-acyltransferase is an enzyme that catalyzes the chemical reaction

palmitoyl-CoA + ecdysone  CoA + ecdysone palmitate

Thus, the two substrates of this enzyme are palmitoyl-CoA and ecdysone, whereas its two products are CoA and ecdysone palmitate.

This enzyme belongs to the family of transferases, specifically those acyltransferases transferring groups other than aminoacyl groups.  The systematic name of this enzyme class is palmitoyl-CoA:ecdysone palmitoyltransferase. Other names in common use include acyl-CoA:ecdysone acyltransferase, and fatty acyl-CoA:ecdysone acyltransferase.

References

 

EC 2.3.1
Enzymes of unknown structure